The 2022 Rugby Europe Super Cup is the second edition of the Rugby Europe Super Cup, an annual rugby union competition for professional franchises outside the three 'big leagues' of European Rugby. The competition will feature two new teams, the Romanian Wolves and RC Batumi from Georgia.

Format
Each participant will play home and away-fixtures in six rounds of action, to be played between September and December. At the end of the pool stage, the top two teams from each conference will qualify for the semi-finals, with the conference winners hosting the ties.

Teams

Group stage

Eastern Conference

Round 1

Round 2

Round 3

Round 4

Round 5

Round 6

Western Conference

Round 1

Round 2

Round 3

Round 4

Round 5

Round 6

Play-Offs

Semi-finals

Final

References

Rugby Europe Super Cup
Rugby Europe Super Cup
Rugby Europe Super Cup